Venice Kamel Gouda is an Egyptian research professor and a former Minister of State for Scientific Research (1993–97).

Early life
Daughter to accountant Kamel Gouda and his wife Victoria Attalah, Venice was born on 7 October 1934 and received her B.Sc. degree from Ain Shams University in 1956. She did her M.Sc. (1959) and PhD (1962) from Cairo University.

Career
Gouda began her career as an assistant research chemist at the National Research Centre (NRC) in 1956 and from 1962 to 1966, was an associate professor at the Clarkson College of Technology. In 1991, she became the director of NRC's applied inorganic chemistry division. In October 1993 Egyptian President Hosni Mubarak appointed her the Minister of State for Scientific Research, a post she held till July 1997.

Gouda is an active member of the International Corrosion Council and has headed several Egyptian delegations to foreign countries. In recognition of her contributions to scientific research, the Egyptian Academy of Scientific Research and Technology honoured her in 1974. She has also been awarded by the NRC and presidential decoration (1976).

References

External links
 
 

1934 births
Living people
Egyptian academics
Ain Shams University alumni
Cairo University alumni
Clarkson University faculty